Les Loges-sur-Brécey (literally Les Loges on Brécey) is a commune in the Manche department in Normandy in north-western France.

A small, very rural commune some 5 km North of the small town of Brecey. With no centre to the commune other than the church, the 90 habitations (of which about 10% are holiday homes belonging to both French and British) are spread over a large geographical area. The majority of the population of approximately 150 are farming families, both retired and active. This is augmented by a small number of professional people, artisans and a very small number of English ex-pats.

See also
Communes of the Manche department

References

Logessurbrecey